The Journal of Wildlife Management is a peer-reviewed scientific journal devoted to the ecology of non-domesticated animal species. It is published by John Wiley & Sons on behalf of The Wildlife Society.

History 
July 1937 – first issue of the journal.

See also 
 Wildlife Monographs
 Wildlife Society Bulletin

References

External links 
 

Publications established in 1937
Ecology journals
English-language journals